William Moseley Jones (1905–1988) was a Democratic attorney from Montebello, California who served several terms in the California State Assembly, including one term as Speaker.

Biography 
William Moseley Jones was raised in Las Vegas, Nevada. He attended Occidental College and received a law degree from the University of Southern California in 1927. After practicing law in Los Angeles for five years, Jones was elected to represent the 51st Assembly District (Montebello) in 1932. In the 1936 elections, California Democrats gained their first Assembly majority in the 20th Century and elected Jones as Speaker for the 1937 session.

Jones was a Mason, Redmen, Elk, and was President of the Belvedere Gardens Lions Club in the 1930s.

In 1944, Jones helped organize a savings and loan that, in 1953, became Pacific Savings and Loan. Jones served as President of Pacific Savings and Loan for many years thereafter. In 1969, Jones was elected President of the California Savings and Loan League.

Jones died at age 82 on March 24, 1988 and is buried at Pacific View Memorial Park in Newport Beach, California.

References

External links 
  California Assembly web page
  UC Regents historical biographies

External links
Join California William Moseley Jones

1905 births
1988 deaths
People from Portsmouth, Ohio
People from the Las Vegas Valley
People from Montebello, California
Occidental College alumni
USC Gould School of Law alumni
California lawyers
Speakers of the California State Assembly
Democratic Party members of the California State Assembly
20th-century American politicians
20th-century American lawyers